There was a by-election for Belfast West constituency on 29 November 1950.

It occurred after the winner at the 1950 UK general election, James Godfrey MacManaway, was disqualified as he was a priest.

Thomas Teevan, the Unionist candidate, narrowly beat Jack Beattie, a former MP for the constituency who was the candidate of the Irish Labour Party, by 913 votes.  However Beattie beat Teevan at the 1951 general election.

Result

External links 
A Vision of Britain Through Time (Constituency elector numbers)

References

1950 elections in the United Kingdom
West
20th century in Belfast
1950 elections in Northern Ireland